Brice Canyon (also known as the Brice Draw), is a canyon in southeast–central La Plata County, Colorado, United States. Its mouth is located at an elevation of  along the Florida River. The southern part of the canyon is located in the Southern Ute Indian Reservation.

See also

References

 

Canyons and gorges of Colorado
Landforms of La Plata County, Colorado